Aswin Jose is an Indian actor and filmmaker who works predominantly in the Malayalam film industry. Aswin made his debut in acting through Malayalam film Queen in 2018, he gained wider attention for his role in the same movie. The song Nenjinakath lalettan and the performance of  Aswin was noticeable in the movie.

After Queen, he acted in Harisree Ashokan's debut directorial movie An International Local Story (2018) in a lead role. Kumbarees was his other movie got released on 23 August 2019.

The extended cameo role in the movie Adhyarathri (2019) directed by Jibu Jacob was one of his memorable performance.

The village photographer role played by Aswin in the sensational musical album Colour Padam was a tremendous performance in his career. Colour Padam also has the distinction of being a short film released in Malayalam in HDR format.

Filmography

References

Indian male film actors
Living people
Male actors in Malayalam cinema
Year of birth missing (living people)